Iqbal Narain (born 1930) was an Indian academician, social scientist, and the 16th Vice-Chancellor of Banaras Hindu University. He was the chief editor of Political Science Review, member of several government committees, and wrote articles in Economic and Political Weekly. He has also served as the Vice-chancellor of University of Rajasthan.

See also 
 Banaras Hindu University
 List of vice-chancellors of Banaras Hindu University
 University of Rajasthan

References 

Banaras Hindu University people
Vice Chancellors of Banaras Hindu University
1930 births
Possibly living people